Lazio or Latium (from the original Latin name) is one of the 20 administrative regions of Italy. Situated in the central peninsular section of the country, it has 5,714,882 inhabitants and a GDP of more than €197 billion per year, making it the country's second most populated region and second largest regional economy after Lombardy. The capital of Lazio is Rome, which is also the capital and largest city of Italy.

Geography 

The region is mainly flat, with small mountainous areas in the most eastern and southern districts.

The coast of Lazio is mainly composed of sandy beaches, punctuated by the headlands of Cape Circeo (541 m) and Gaeta (171 m). The Pontine Islands, which are part of Lazio, are off Lazio's southern coast. Behind the coastal strip, to the north, lies the Maremma Laziale (the continuation of the Tuscan Maremma), a coastal plain interrupted at Civitavecchia by the Tolfa Mountains (616 m). The southern districts are characterized by the flatlands of Agro Pontino, a once swampy and malarial area, that was reclaimed over the centuries.

The Preapennines of Latium, marked by the Tiber valley and the Liri with the Sacco tributary, include on the right of the Tiber, three groups of mountains of volcanic origin: the Volsini, Cimini and Sabatini, whose largest former craters are occupied by the Bolsena, Vico and Bracciano lakes. To the south of the Tiber, other mountain groups form part of the Preapennines: the Alban Hills, also of volcanic origin, and the calcareous Lepini, Ausoni and Aurunci Mountains. The Apennines of Latium are a continuation of the Apennines of Abruzzo: the Reatini Mountains with Terminillo (2,213 m), Mounts Sabini, Prenestini, Simbruini and Ernici which continue east of the Liri into the Mainarde Mountains. The highest peak is Mount Gorzano (2,458 m) on the border with Abruzzo.

History 

The Italian word Lazio descends from the Latin word Latium, the region of the Latins, Latini in the Latin language spoken by them and passed on to the Latin city-state of Ancient Rome. Although the demography of ancient Rome was multi-ethnic, including, for example, Etruscans, Sabines and other Italics besides the Latini, the latter were the dominant constituent. In Roman mythology, the tribe of the Latini took their name from King Latinus. Apart from the mythical derivation of Lazio given by the ancients as the place where Saturn, ruler of the golden age in Latium, hid (latuisset) from Jupiter there, a major modern etymology is that Lazio comes from the Latin word "latus", meaning "wide", expressing the idea of "flat land" meaning the Roman Campagna. Much of Lazio is in fact flat or rolling. The lands originally inhabited by the Latini were extended into the territories of the Samnites, the Marsi, the Hernici, the Aequi, the Aurunci and the Volsci, all surrounding Italic tribes.  This larger territory was still called Latium, but it was divided into Latium adiectum or Latium Novum, the added lands or New Latium, and Latium Vetus, or Old Latium, the older, smaller region. The northern border of Lazio was the Tiber river, which divided it from Etruria.

The emperor Augustus officially united almost all of present-day Italy into a single geo-political entity, Italia, dividing it into eleven regions. The part of today's Lazio south of the Tiber river – together with the present region of Campania immediately to the southeast of Lazio and the seat of Neapolis – became Region I (Latium et Campania), while modern Upper Lazio became part of Regio VII - Etruria, and today's Province of Rieti joined Regio IV - Samnium.

After the Gothic conquest of Italy at the end of the fifth century, modern Lazio became part of the Ostrogothic Kingdom, but after the Gothic War between 535 and 554 and conquest by the Byzantine Empire, the region became the property of the Eastern Emperor as the Duchy of Rome. However, the long wars against the Longobards weakened the region. With the Donation of Sutri in 728, the Pope acquired the first territory in the region beyond the Duchy of Rome.

The strengthening of the religious and ecclesiastical aristocracy led to continuous power struggles between secular lords (Baroni) and the Pope until the middle of the 16th century. Innocent III tried to strengthen his own territorial power, wishing to assert his authority in the provincial administrations of Tuscia, Campagna and Marittima through the Church's representatives, in order to reduce the power of the Colonna family. Other popes tried to do the same. During the period when the papacy resided in Avignon, France (1309–1377), the feudal lords' power increased due to the absence of the Pope from Rome. Small communes, and Rome above all, opposed the lords' increasing power, and with Cola di Rienzo, they tried to present themselves as antagonists of the ecclesiastical power. However, between 1353 and 1367, the papacy regained control of Lazio and the rest of the Papal States. From the middle of the 16th century, the papacy politically unified Lazio with the Papal States, so that these territories became provincial administrations of St. Peter's estate; governors in Viterbo, in Marittima and Campagna, and in Frosinone administered them for the papacy.

Lazio was part of the short-lived Roman Republic, after which it became a puppet state of the First French Republic under the forces of Napoleon Bonaparte. Lazio was returned to the Papal States in October 1799. In 1809, it was annexed to the French Empire under the name of the Department of Tibre, but returned to the Pope's control in 1815.

On 20 September 1870 the capture of Rome, during the reign of Pope Pius IX, and France's defeat at Sedan, completed Italian unification, and Lazio was incorporated into the Kingdom of Italy. In 1927, the territory of the Province of Rieti, belonging to Umbria and Abruzzo, joined Lazio. Towns in Lazio were devastated by the 2016 Central Italy earthquake.

Economy 
Agriculture, crafts, animal husbandry and fishery are the main traditional sources of income. Agriculture is characterized by the cultivation of wine grapes, fruit, vegetables and olives. Lazio is the main growing region of kiwi in Italy.

Approximately 73% of the working population are employed in the services sector, which contribute 85.8% of regional GDP; this is a considerable proportion, but is justified by the presence of Rome, which is the core of public administration, media, utility, telecommunication, transport, tourism and other sectors. Many national and multinational corporations, public and private, have their headquarters in Rome (ENI, Italiana Petroli, Enel, Acea, Terna, TIM, Poste italiane, Leonardo, ITA Airways, Ferrovie dello Stato Italiane, RAI).

Lazio's limited industrial sector and highly developed service industries allowed the region to well outperform the Italian economy in 2009 in the heart of the global financial crisis, but it was strongly affected by the COVID-19 crisis of 2020–2021 due to the lock-downs.

Industrial development in Lazio is limited to the areas south of Rome. Communications and – above all – the setting of the border of the Cassa del Mezzogiorno some kilometers south of Rome have influenced the position of industry, favouring the areas with the best links to Rome and those near the Autostrada del Sole, especially around Frosinone. Additional factor was cheap energy supply from Latina Nuclear Power Plant and Garigliano Nuclear Power Plant, which are now out of the operation after Italian nuclear energy referendum.

Industry 

Industry contributes a small part of GDP, share is 8.9% compared to 25.0% in Veneto and 24.0% in Emilia-Romagna. In Rome even less with 7%, compare of 12% from tourism. Virtually no any machine building or metallurgy exists in Lazio.

Firms are often small to medium in size and operate in the 
 oil refining (Gaeta)
 automobile (Cassino Plant, which produced 53,422 Alfa Romeo cars in 2020 and has 3,433 employees.)
 yachts and boats (Canados Shipyard in Rome-Ostia)
 engineering (Rieti, Anagni (rotor blades and composite structures; stone extractions machines Fantoni Sud), Frosinone (helicopter transmissions)) 
 electronic (Viterbo, Rome, Pomezia, Latina). A large Texas Instruments plant in Rieti was closed with the loss of thousands of jobs.
 building and building materials (Rome, Civitavecchia)
Well-developed travertine-processing industry, especially in the Ausoni-Tiburtina area (Tivoli and Guidonia Montecelio quarries). 
ca. 70% of the national sanitary ceramics comes from Civita Castellana industrial district and Gaeta 
 textile (Valle del Liri). In the district the production relationships are mostly of the subcontractor type, 40% of the companies produce semi-finished and finished products not intended for marketing.  

There is some R&D activity in high technology: IBM (IBM Rome Software Lab), Ericsson, Leonardo Electronics (Rome-Tiburtina, Rome-Laurentina, Pomezia, Latina), Rheinmetall ("Radar House") and tire industry: Bridgestone (R&D center in Rome and proving grounds in Aprilia).

Consumer goods
The most distinctive industry in Lazio is production of household chemicals, pharmaceutical and hygiene goods, toilet paper and tissue products: Sigma-Tau, Johnson & Johnson, Procter & Gamble, Colgate Palmolive, Henkel, Pfizer, Abott, Catalent, Angelini, Menarini, Biopharma, Wepa.

Space
 Avio in Colleferro has headquarters and make research, development and manufacturing of solid propellant motors and liquid propellant engines for launch vehicles and tactical propulsion systems; boosters for Ariane 5 rocket
 Satellite services are provided from Telespazio which headquarters in Rome 
 Thales Alenia Space has 2 locations in Rome (Tiburtina and Saccomuro) and makes design and integration of terrestrial observation, navigation and telecommunications satellites

Agriculture 

From fruits the most important are kiwifruit (1st place in Italy) and hazel nuts "Nocciola romana". Italy itself is the second largest producer of kiwifruit worldwide and was surpassed only by China. Infrastructure which has been used for grape growing was easily adapted for kiwifruit cultivation.

Animal husbandry 

Only sheep and buffalo herds are significant nationwide. Both keep dominantly for milk, which using to production Pecorino Romano and Mozzarella di Buffalo cheese. Sheep herds is the 3rd nationwide after Sardinia and Sicily. 40% of sheep are breeding in province of Viterbo.

Viticulture 
Vineyards cover  in Lazio. 90% of wines are white. In production of quality wine Lazio has rank 14 of 20 with 190.557 hl.
There are 3 DOCG wines:
 Frascati Superiore
 Cannellino di Frascati
 Cesanese del Piglio

Unemployment 
The unemployment rate stood at 9.1% in 2020.

Demographics 

With a population of 5,714,882 million (as of 31 December 2021), Lazio is the second-most populated region of Italy. The overall population density in the region is 341 inhabitants per km2. However, the population density widely ranges from almost 800 inhabitants per km2 in the highly urbanized Rome metropolitan area to less than 60 inhabitants per km2 in the mountainous and rural Province of Rieti. As of January 2010, the Italian national institute of statistics ISTAT estimated that 497,940 foreign-born immigrants live in Lazio, equal to 8.8% of the total regional population.

Government and politics 

Rome is centre-left politically oriented by tradition, while the rest of Lazio is centre-right oriented. In the 2008 general election, Lazio gave 44.2% of its vote to the centre-right coalition, while the centre-left block took 41.4% of vote. In the 2013 general election, Lazio gave 40.7% of its vote to the centre-left block coalition, 29.3% to the centre-right coalition and 20.2 to the Five Star Movement.

Administrative divisions 
Lazio is divided into four provinces and one metropolitan (province-level) city:

Cuisine

One of the most famous forms of food in Lazio is pasta. Dishes first attested inside the  region's borders include:

Guanciale is used in several sauces. Guanciale is the cut of pork obtained from the cheek of the pig, crossed by lean veins of muscle with a component of valuable fat, of a composition different from lardo (back fat) and pancetta (belly fat): the consistency is harder than pancetta and it possesses a more distinctive flavor. Guanciale is salted pork fat, different from bacon, which is smoked. It is a typical product of Lazio, Umbria and Abruzzo. Another important ingredient is Pecorino Romano cheese.

Vegetables are common, artichokes (carciofi) being among the most popular:

Other popular vegetables are romanesco broccoli, asparagus, fava bean, cima di rapa, romaine lettuce, pumpkin, zucchini and chicory.

Spices 

In the cuisine of Lazio, spices are widely used. Among the most used are lesser cat-mint, called in Rome "Mentuccia" (for artichokes and mushrooms), squaw mint, called in Rome "Menta romana" (for lamb and tripe), laurel, rosemary, sage, juniper, chili and grated truffle.

Quinto quarto 

Although Roman and Lazio cuisine use cheap ingredients like vegetable and pasta, poor people needed a source of protein. Therefore, they used the so-called "Quinto quarto" (The fifth quarter), leftovers from animal carcasses that remained after the sale of prized parts to the wealthy.

Quinto quarto includes tripe (the most valuable part of reticulum, also called "cuffia", "l'omaso" or "lampredotto"), kidneys (which need to be soaked for a long time in water with lemon to remove urine smell), heart, liver, spleen, sweetbreads (pancreas, thymus and salivary glands), brain, tongue, ox tail, trotters and pajata (intestines of calf, fed only with its mother's milk). The intestines are cleaned and skinned but the chyme (mass of partly digested food) is left inside. Typical dishes of this style are:

Meat dishes 
Traditional meat dishes include Saltimbocca alla Romana (veal wrapped with Prosciutto di Parma and sage and cooked in white wine, butter and flour) and Abbacchio alla Romana (roasted lamb with garlic, rosemary, pepper and chopped prosciutto).

Sports 
The region gives its name to the professional football club Lazio that plays in the Italian Serie A. The region has two professional clubs in the top flight, the other being Roma, who also play in the highest division of Italian football. Combined, the two have won five Italian championships with Roma winning three and Lazio two. The main sports stadium in Lazio is Stadio Olimpico in Rome which has housed both teams for a prolonged time and hosts Derby della Capitale between the two clubs. The stadium also hosted the 1960 Summer Olympics and the 1990 FIFA World Cup Final. Outside of Rome the football scene has only had one other club previously playing in the Serie A, that being Frosinone.

Lazio hosts no top-line motorsports events, but the Vallelunga circuit previously hosted the Superbike World Championship in motorcycle racing.

See also
 Geography of Italy
 Regions of Italy
 Administrative divisions of Italy
 Roman cuisine

References

External links 

Official Touristic Site of the Regione Lazio  
Official Site of the Regione Lazio  

 
NUTS 2 statistical regions of the European Union
Regions of Italy
Wine regions of Italy